America's Finest City Half Marathon is an annual road running event over the half marathon distance  which is held in mid-August on the streets of San Diego, California. ("America's Finest City" is the official nickname of the city of San Diego.) The race was inaugurated in 1978 and has been held every year since then. By 1985, more than 6000 professional and amateur runners were taking part in the race each year. Both men and women are able to enter into the half marathon and shorter 5 kilometer fun run.

The race is used to raise money for the American Lung Association and in its first fourteen years of existence it had cumulatively raised US$1.7 million for the non-profit organization. The race was sponsored by the Home Federal Bank in the 1980s and early 1990s. The organizers endured financial difficulties in 1992 after the loss of its title sponsor. The race remained popular, however, and the following year over five thousand runners took part; among them was television host Oprah Winfrey, running under the pseudonym "Bobbi Jo Jenkins" and accompanied by a bodyguard, a trainer, and a video crew. At the 33rd edition in 2010, the half marathon and 5K races attracted an international field of almost 10,000 runners and the event had raised $3.8 million for non-profit organizations. That year, Ethiopian training partners Ezkyas Sisay and Belaynesh Zemedkun topped the men's and women's fields respectively.

The course of the half marathon has a point-to-point format. It starts on the Point Loma Peninsula next to the Cabrillo National Monument – some 300 feet (91 m) above sea-level. The course heads north and descends towards San Diego Bay. Turning eastwards onto North Harbor Drive, the race enters a flat straight around the five mile (8 km) mark. After looping around Harbor Island the course heads south, passing near the Star of India museum ship and San Diego Broadway. It traces a path northwards at this point, heading along Sixth Avenue and Laurel Street on its way to Downtown San Diego. The race finishing point is Pan American Plaza in Balboa Park.

Kenyan Nelson Oyugi holds the men's half marathon course record of 1:01:59, while Belaynesh Zemedkun is the women's record holder with her time of 1:10:28. The men's race over the distance has been dominated by Kenyans, with 13 wins since the mid-1990s, but Americans are historically strong on the women's side with seventeen race wins. The United States has produced the most winners overall, with 25 of the half marathon's winners hailing from the host country. Patrick Muturi of Kenya is the only man to win the race twice. Maria Trujillo has the most wins to her name, having won the race on four occasions.

A virtual race was held in 2020, and entrants were given the option to get either a refund or defer their entry to 2021.

Past half marathon winners

Key:

 † = The 1980 course was mis-marked and was around 800 metres longer than the true half marathon distance.

Statistics

Winners by country

Multiple winners

References

List of winners
Leydig, Jack (2010-08-16). America's Finest City Half Marathon. Association of Road Racing Statisticians. Retrieved on 2010-09-23.

External links

Official website

Half marathons in the United States
Recurring sporting events established in 1978
Foot races in California
Sports in San Diego
1978 establishments in California
Annual sporting events in the United States